Gelora Bung Karno Madya Stadium or simply Madya Stadium is a secondary stadium in Gelora Bung Karno Sports Complex with a capacity of 9,170 (20.000++ for concerts). It is used mostly for track and field athletics training and events. It is located west-northwest of the complex's Main Stadium. Opened in December 1961, it was used as the venue for the field hockey event of the 1962 Asian Games, during which it was known as the Senayan Hockey Stadium or the Senayan Open Stadium. After falling into severe disrepair and even being used for illegal greyhound racing at some point, the stadium was renovated, converted to an athletics stadium and hosted the 1985 Asian Athletics Championships. The stadium was used as a warm-up spot during the 2018 Asian Games and closing ceremony of the 2018 Asian Para Games. This stadium planned to serve as the venue of Justin Bieber's Justice World Tour on November 2 and 3, 2022 before it was postponed due to health issues. This stadium was briefly used by Bhayangkara during their 2019 season, amid renovations of their home ground PTIK Stadium.

Gallery

References

External links
 Profile on GBK Sports Complex official website

Sports venues in Indonesia
Multi-purpose stadiums in Indonesia
Football venues in Indonesia
Athletics (track and field) venues in Indonesia
Athletics (track and field) venues in Jakarta
Football venues in Jakarta
Sports venues in Jakarta
Sports venues completed in 1962
Post-independence architecture of Indonesia
Venues of the 1962 Asian Games